Maïa Mazzara (born 5 August 2003) is a French figure skater who currently represents France in ladies singles and formerly represented Switzerland. She is a two-time French national silver medalist.

On the junior level, she is the 2019 French junior national champion, the 2019 Master's de Patinage champion, and placed 9th at the 2016 Winter Youth Olympics.

Representing Switzerland on the junior level, she is the 2017 Merano Cup silver medalist and the 2017 Swiss junior national champion.

Career

Early years 
Mazzara began learning how to skate in 2011 at the age of seven. She started her skating career competing for her native France at the pre-novice level in 2014, but by 2016 had begun representing Switzerland.

2017–18 season: Junior international debut 
Mazzara made her international junior debut for Switzerland in November 2017 at the Cup of Nice, where she finished 11th overall. Later in the same month, Mazzara won the silver medal in the junior-level ladies event at the Merano Cup in Italy. In January 2018, Mazzara won her first and only Swiss junior national title and was assigned to compete at the 2018 World Junior Championships. There, Mazzara finished 35th in the short program and thus did not advance to the free skate.

2018–19 season 
In August 2018, Mazzara made her ISU Junior Grand Prix debut at the 2018 JGP Slovakia in Bratislava, where she finished tenth. This was her only international assignment of the season. Later in the season, Mazzara competed under the Swiss flag as a guest at the 2019 French Championships, finishing seventh at the senior level and second at the junior level. She did not compete at the Swiss Championships.

2019–20 season: Senior international debut 
Mazzara returned to representing France in 2019, now coached by Florent Amodio and Françoise Bonnard in Vaujany, France, after the passing of her former coach Jean-François Ballester in late 2018. She began her season by placing first in the junior ladies event at the French test competition, Master's de Patinage, and received two Junior Grand Prix assignments: 2019 JGP Russia and 2019 JGP Italy. Mazzara placed 20th and ninth at these events, respectively. 

After her junior events, Mazzara made her first senior start at the 2019 Tallinn Trophy, where she finished fifth and later competed at the 2019 CS Golden Spin of Zagreb, her first Challenger event, where she finished ninth. In December 2019, 16-year-old Mazzara won the silver medal behind reigning French champion Maé-Bérénice Méité at the 2020 French Championships. Due to her placement at the event, Mazzara was named to the French team for the 2020 European Championships.

In January 2020, Mazzara returned to junior-level competition at the 2020 Winter Youth Olympics. She finished ninth overall and set new personal bests in all three segments, surpassing her previous best total score by nearly seven points.  Making her debut at the senior 2020 European Championships, Mazzara placed eleventh and then finished the season with a seventeenth-place finish at the 2020 World Junior Championships.

2020–21 season 
Mazzara was scheduled to make her Grand Prix debut at the 2020 Internationaux de France, but the event was cancelled as a result of the COVID-19 pandemic. She instead opened her season in early November in Minsk at the 2020 Winter Star where she placed fifth in the short program and third in the free skate to win the bronze medal overall. In February, she won her second straight silver medal at Nationals. Mazzara was part of the French team for the 2021 World Team Trophy, where she finished eleventh in both segments while Team France finished fifth.

2021–22 season 
Mazzara began the season at the 2021 CS Lombardia Trophy, where she finished fourteenth, four ordinals, and fourteen points below fellow Frenchwoman Léa Serna. As a result, Serna was substituted for Mazzara as France's entry at the 2021 CS Nebelhorn Trophy, the Olympic qualifier. She went on to finish sixth at the 2021 CS Golden Spin of Zagreb, fourth at the French championships, and sixth at the International Challenge Cup.

2022–23 season 
After finishing seventh at the 2022 CS Nepela Memorial, Mazzara was at last able to make her Grand Prix debut with a twelfth-place result at the 2022 Grand Prix de France.

Programs

Competitive highlights 
GP: Grand Prix; CS: Challenger Series; JGP: Junior Grand Prix

For France

For Switzerland

Detailed results

For France

For Switzerland

References

External links 
 

2003 births
French female single skaters
Swiss female single skaters
Living people
People from Clamart
Figure skaters at the 2020 Winter Youth Olympics
Competitors at the 2023 Winter World University Games
Sportspeople from Hauts-de-Seine